Caecilia subterminalis is a species of caecilian in the family Caeciliidae. It is endemic to Ecuador.

References

subterminalis
Amphibians of Ecuador
Amphibians described in 1968
Taxonomy articles created by Polbot